Kilwinning is a hamlet in Saskatchewan. The community is named after Kilwinning in North Ayrshire, Scotland, which was the original home of its first postmaster, James Dunlop. It had a post office from 1905 to 1963.

See also

References

Unincorporated communities in Saskatchewan
Leask No. 464, Saskatchewan
Division No. 16, Saskatchewan